Dudaş is a village in the District of Beypazarı, Ankara Province, Turkey.

References

Villages in Beypazarı District